Sangha Trinational is a forest divided between the nations of Central African Republic, Cameroon and Congo-Brazzaville. It was added as a UNESCO World Heritage Site in 2012 because of its outstanding biodiversity and unique biological communities. The site includes 3 contiguous national parks within the humid tropical forests of Central Africa: Nouabalé-Ndoki National Park in Congo, Lobéké National Park in Cameroon, and Dzanga-Ndoki National Park in Central African Republic. The large size of the site and the relatively limited amount of deforestation within the three parks has allowed populations of vulnerable species such as African forest elephants, gorillas, sitatunga, and chimpanzees to thrive. In addition, populations of critically endangered plant species such as Mukulungu are protected within the site's borders.

References

World Heritage Sites in the Central African Republic
World Heritage Sites in the Republic of the Congo
World Heritage Sites in Cameroon
Forests of Cameroon
Geography of the Republic of the Congo
Sangha-Mbaéré
Sangha River